Friedrich Georg Leonhard Miedke, also Miedtke<ref>Die Schreibung „Miedke“ findet sich among others in folgenden Informationsquellen: WBIS Online; Paul S. Ulrich: Biographisches Verzeichnis für Theater, Tanz und Musik. 2nd edition, Berlin 1997 (Berliner Wissenschafts-Verlag) – http://d-nb.info/gnd/117027014; die Schreibweise Miedtke among others in Constant Wurzbach, Biographisches Lexikon des Kaisertums Österreich' - 13th part - Kosarek - Lagkner, Graz 1865, . s. https://www.literature.at/viewer.alo?objid=11816&viewmode=fullscreen&scale=3.33&rotate=&page=196, vereinzelt ist auch die Schreibweise „Miedcke“ anzutreffen.</ref> (January 1803 – 16 October 1842) was a German actor, singer, composer, theatre director, painter and writer

 Life 
Miedke was a son of the singer and actor couple Carl Miedke and Charlotte Miedke, and was born in Nuremberg between 1 and 31 January 1803.

He was artistically active in Stuttgart, St. Gallen, Augsburg, Ulm, Regensburg, Würzburg and other places. He was considered one of the finest dramatic baritones of his time, shining among others in the operas Don Juan, Figaro and Vampyr.  He received his training in Stuttgart and then sang first in the choir until he was given smaller stage roles, which also distinguished him as an actor. In 1822 he received an engagement in Augsburg. In 1825, he took over the direction of the theatre of the city of St. Gallen, which, however, affected his private fortune so much that he secretly left Switzerland. The subsequent trial resulted in him having to spend 12 weeks in the Hohenasperg in Württemberg. After his release, he immediately turned to the city of Würzburg in 1829, where he was given the directorship of the opera on a fixed salary, which he held until the end of 1836.  On 6 March 1834, a performance of the opera Faust by Louis Spohr took place in Würzburg "for the benefit" of Miedke.

From 1837, he retired from the stage and settled first in Bad Kissingen to devote himself entirely to painting; he also ran a gallery and was active as a writer. He died in Regensburg at the age of 39.

 Work 
 Jean Dupuis und Simon Meisinger, Faschingsposse in 2 Abtheilungen von Friedrich Miedtke. Erstaufführung am 23. Februar 1841 in Regensburg.

 References 

 Further reading 
 Artikel Miedke, Friedrich Georg Leonhard. In Gustav Schilling, Gottfried Wilhelm Fink, Ferdinand Simon Gaßner (publisher and collaborator): Encyclopädie der gesammten musikalischen Wissenschaften oder Universal-Lexicon der Tonkunst, vol. 4: Irregulärer Durchgang bis Morin. Franz Heinrich Röbler publisher, Stuttgart 1837,  (Numerized at the Bayerischer Staatsbibliothek).

 External links 
Friedrich Georg Leonhard Miedke on Lexikon des Kaisertums Österreich''

German operatic baritones
German composers
German male stage actors
German theatre directors
1803 births
1842 deaths
Actors from Nuremberg